The everyman is a stock character of fiction. An ordinary and humble character, the everyman is generally a protagonist whose benign conduct fosters the audience's identification with them.

Origin

The term everyman was used as early as an  English morality play from the early 1500s: The Summoning of Everyman. The play's protagonist is an allegorical character representing an ordinary human who knows he is soon to die; according to literature scholar Harry Keyishian he is portrayed as "prosperous, gregarious, [and] attractive". Everyman is the only human character of the play; the others are embodied ideas such as Fellowship, who "symbolizes the transience and limitations of human friendship".

The use of the term everyman to refer generically to a portrayal of an ordinary or typical person dates to the early 20th century. The term everywoman originates in the same period, having been used by George Bernard Shaw to describe the character Ann Whitefield of his play Man and Superman.

Narrative uses

An everyman is described with the intent that most audience members can readily identify with him. Although the everyman may have difficulties that a hero might, archetypal heroes react rapidly and vigorously by manifest action, whereas an everyman typically avoids engagement or reacts ambivalently, until the situation, growing dire, demands effective reaction to avert disaster. Such a "round", dynamic character—that is, a character showing complexity and development—is generally a protagonist.

Or if lacking complexity and development—thus a "flat", static character—then the everyman is a secondary character. Especially in literature, there is often a narrator, as the written medium enables extensive explication of, for example, previous events, internal details, and mental content. An everyman narrator may be noticed little, whether by other characters or sometimes even by the reader. A narrating everyman, like Ché in the musical Evita, may even address the audience directly.

List of examples

 The anonymous "Common Man" of Robert Bolt's play A Man for All Seasons (1960).
 Leopold Bloom of James Joyce's novel Ulysses (serialized 1918–1920, published in its entirety in 1922)
 The anonymous narrator of Chuck Palahniuk's novel Fight Club (1996) and its movie adaptation (1999)
 C.C. "Bud" Baxter of Billy Wilder's movie The Apartment (1960).
 Emmet Brickowski of The Lego Movie
 Charlie Brown of Charles Schulz's comic strip Peanuts.
 Ché in Tim Rice and Andrew Lloyd Webber's musical Evita
 Christian of John Bunyan's book The Pilgrim's Progress (1678).
 Norman Dale of the film Hoosiers.
 Arthur Dent of Douglas Adams' novel The Hitchhiker's Guide to the Galaxy novels
 James Gordon in DC Comics.
 Jim Halpert in the television series The Office.
 Jonathan Harker of Bram Stoker's novel Dracula (1897).
 George Jetson of the cartoon television series The Jetsons.
 Will Kane of Fred Zinnemann's movie High Noon (1952).
 Jacob Kowalski of J. K. Rowling's Fantastic Beasts and Where to Find Them books and movies.
 Stan Marsh of the cartoon television series South Park.
 Joe Martin of the television series All My Children.
 Marty McFly of the movie Back to the Future.
 Ted Mosby of the television series How I Met Your Mother.
 Jack Ryan in Tom Clancy's book and film series known as the Ryanverse
 Winston Smith in George Orwell's novel Nineteen Eighty-Four (1949)
 Egbert Souse in Edward F. Cline's film The Bank Dick (1940)

See also

Average Joe – wholly average person
Commoner – person neither nobility, royalty, nor priesthood
Elckerlijc – Dutch medieval morality play
Everyman's right – freedom to roam
Kafkaesque – everyman being overwhelmed by vast, dehumanizing social labyrinth
Man on the Bondi tram – hypothetical reasonable Australian 
Person having ordinary skill in the art
John Q. Public – generic, hypothetical "common man"
Reasonable person – term helping a jury interpret a law's wording
Straight man
T.C. Mits – acronym for "the celebrated man in the street"
The man on the Clapham omnibus – hypothetical reasonable person
Zé Povinho – Portuguese everyman

References

 
Stock characters